All-Clad Metalcrafters, LLC is a U.S. manufacturer of cookware with headquarters in Canonsburg, Pennsylvania. The company markets its cookware to department stores and specialty stores in the United States, Australia, Canada, Germany, and the UK, along with All-Clad bonded ovenware, kitchen tools, and kitchen accessories.

History 

The business was founded by metallurgist John Ulam, in 1967, as a manufacturer of bonded metals, including coinage for the U.S. Mint, avionics, and ballistics.  The company was instrumental in the shift to bonded metal coins.

The company's move to cookware happened by accident, when Ulam made a pan for his personal use.  All-Clad Metalcrafters was established in 1971 to sell this cookware. Bloomingdale's picked up the brand two years later, for its upscale housewares department.  In 1988, All-Clad Metalcrafters was purchased by Pittsburgh Annealing Box Co. and in 2004, it was bought by the French conglomerate  Groupe SEB.

In 2000, All-Clad partnered with television chef and personality Emeril Lagasse to develop a line of cookware named "Emerilware".

In 2014 All-Clad partnered with Chef Thomas Keller to produce the All-Clad TK that feature bonded aluminum and stainless with a copper core.

United States patents 
At the time of its founding, All-Clad used a patented "roll bonding" process by which metals are sandwiched together and then formed into a cooking vessel. The company derived its name from this cladding process, which is applied not only on the bottom but extends all the way up the sides of each cooking vessel. The company has been issued several patents by the United States Patent and Trademark Office (USPTO).

Production 
The firm purchases some of its metals from United States-based suppliers, including Pennsylvania Steel Company.

Cookware

Interior Finishes 
The cooking surface is made from Type 304 stainless steel. Some products include a nonstick coating on top of the stainless steel.

All stainless steel used by the company is certified to meet ISO 9000 and ASTM A240 standards for type 304 stainless steel intended for use with food.

Exterior Finishes 
The cookware is available in a combination of exterior metal finishes including stainless steel, brushed stainless steel, brushed aluminium alloy, black hardcoat anodized aluminium, copper, and copper core.

Comparison Chart

Semiannual factory sale
Each year in June and December, All-Clad Metalcrafters holds a factory seconds sale near their headquarters in Canonsburg.

Gallery

References

External links
 Official All-Clad Website at all-clad.com

Manufacturing companies based in Pennsylvania
Canonsburg, Pennsylvania
Goods manufactured in the United States
Companies based in Washington County, Pennsylvania
Kitchenware brands
American companies established in 1960
Manufacturing companies established in 1960
1960 establishments in Pennsylvania